The Andle Stone is a large gritstone boulder on Stanton Moor in Derbyshire. The stone block is 6m long, 4m high and lies within a low, circular, dry stone wall enclosure. It is covered in cup and ring marks. It is also known as the Oundle Stone, the Anvil Stone or the Twopenny Loaf.

There is a memorial inscription on the west-facing concave face of the boulder, commemorating the Duke of Wellington, Lieutenant Colonel William Thornhill (2nd son of Bache Thornhill of Stanton Hall) and the battles of Assaye and Waterloo. The inscription reads:

The Andle Stone and the nearby Doll Tor stone circle are both on private farmland with no public access rights.

Notes

Megalithic monuments in England
Stone Age sites in England
Archaeological sites in Derbyshire
Buildings and structures in Derbyshire
Tourist attractions in Derbyshire